Robert Kwasi Amoah (born October 17, 1948) is a Ghanaian politician and member of the Seventh Parliament of the Fourth Republic of Ghana representing the Achiase Constituency in the Eastern Region on the ticket of the New Patriotic Party.

Personal life 
Amoah is a Christian. He is married with eight children.

Early life and education 
Amoah was born on October 17, 1948. He hails from Achiase, a town in the Eastern Region of Ghana. He attended Osei Tutu Training College where he had his Certificate A. He also had his Diploma in Agricultural education from St. Andrews College He attended the University of Education, Winneba and obtained his Bachelor of Education and Master of Philosophy degree in Guidance and Counselling.

Politics 
Amoah is a member of the New Patriotic Party (NPP). During the 2020 New Patriotic Party primaries, he lost to Kofi Ahenkorah Marfo.

2012 election 
In the 2012 Ghanaian general election, he won the Achiase Constituency parliamentary seat with 14,395 votes making 62.67% of the total votes cast whilst the NDC parliamentary candidate Dr. Kwasi Akyem Apea-kubi had 8,503 votes making 37.02% of the total votes cast and the NDP parliamentary candidate Charles Kwabena Kurankye had 73 votes making 0.32% of the total votes cast.

2016 election 
In the 2016 Ghanaian general election, he again won the Achiase Constituency parliamentary seat with 14,659 votes making 68.74% of the total votes cast whilst the NDC parliamentary candidate Yaw Sam-Korankye had 6,339 votes making 29.72% of the total votes cast and the CPP parliamentary candidate Botwe Ernest had 328 votes making 1.54% of the total votes.

Committee 
In 2020, Amoah was the Acting Chairman of the Select Committee.

Employment 
Amoah was the Headteacher of LA JSS in Achiase

Philanthropy 
In May 2018, he constructed on oil palm factory in his constituency.

In February 2020, Amoah built a building to serve as the headquarters of the Achiase District Police. He also awarded scholarships to 10 students to continue their tertiary education. He also nursed and shared about 60,000 oil palm seedlings to farmers in his district.

References

Ghanaian MPs 2017–2021
1948 births
Living people
New Patriotic Party politicians
University of Education, Winneba alumni
People from Eastern Region (Ghana)